Sangvor District (Nohiyai Sangvor, before 2016: Tavildara District) is a district of Tajikistan. It lies in the eastern part of the Districts of Republican Subordination, extending north of the Darvaz Range that forms the boundary of the Gorno-Badakhshan Autonomous Region (GBAO). Its northern boundary stretches along Rasht, Tojikobod, and Lakhsh districts. Its capital is Tavildara. The population of the district is 23,300 (January 2020 estimate).

Administrative divisions
They are as follows:

Gallery

Notes

References

Districts of Tajikistan